NGO is an abbreviation for non-governmental organization.

It also may refer to:

 Ngô (吴), a Vietnamese surname equivalent to Chinese name Ng or Wu
 Wu (surname), Ngo in Hokkien
 Ao (surname), Ngo in Cantonese
 .ngo, a file extension for an NG Linker Object (NGML) file
 New Gravitational-wave Observatory, a European Space Agency project
 Chūbu Centrair International Airport, IATA airport code designation
Nagoya Airfield, its former designation